The Tarpon Springs Depot is a former railroad depot built by the Atlantic Coast Line Railroad in 1909, located in downtown Tarpon Springs, Florida at 160 East Tarpon Avenue within the Tarpon Springs Historic District.

The former rail line that serviced the depot, originally built by the Orange Belt Railway in 1888 and last used for a series of special excursion trips to nearby Dunedin and back on March 8, 1987, was converted into a section of the Pinellas Trail in the 1990s.

Historic Depot Museum

The building is now home to the Historic Depot Museum, operated by the Tarpon Springs Area Historical Society.  The museum's exhibits focus on local history and culture, including the role that the railroad played in the growth of the town, education, health care, and local institutions.

See also

Dunedin History Museum
St. Petersburg station (Amtrak)

References

Bibliography

External links

Historic Depot Museum - Tarpon Springs Area Historical Society

Buildings and structures in Tarpon Springs, Florida
History museums in Florida
Museums in Pinellas County, Florida
Railway stations in the United States opened in 1909
Railway stations in Pinellas County, Florida
1909 establishments in Florida
Former railway stations in Florida